Sturnira koopmanhilli is a species of leaf-nosed bat found in South America.

Taxonomy
It was described as a new species in 2006. The holotype had been collected in 1991 in Cotacachi Cayapas Ecological Reserve—a nature reserve in Ecuador. The eponyms for its species name "koopmanhilli" are American zoologist Karl Koopman (1920 – 1997) and British mammalogist John Edwards Hill (1928 – 1997).

Description
Additionally, males weigh , while females weigh .

Range and statust
S. koopmanhilli has been documented in Ecuador and Colombia. The extent of its geographic range is also poorly understood, as are any threats that it may be facing. As of 2016, it was evaluated as a data deficient species by the IUCN because basic details of its biology and ecology are not yet known. It is possibly impacted by the deforestation of the Tumbes-Chocó-Magdalena region.

References

Sturnira
Mammals described in 2006
Bats of South America